Smoky is a 1933 American pre-Code Western film directed by Eugene Forde and written by Stuart Anthony and Paul Perez. The film stars Victor Jory, Irene Bentley, Frank Campeau, Hank Mann, and LeRoy Mason. It is the first of three film adaptations of the 1926 novel Smoky the Cowhorse by Will James, who serves as narrator.

The film was released on December 8, 1933, by Fox Film Corporation.

Plot

Cast       
Victor Jory as Clint Peters
Irene Bentley as Betty Jarvis
Frank Campeau as 'Scrubby'
Hank Mann as Buck
LeRoy Mason as Lefty

References

External links
 

1933 films
Fox Film films
American Western (genre) films
1933 Western (genre) films
Films directed by Eugene Forde
American black-and-white films
Films about horses
Films based on children's books
Films based on Western (genre) novels
1930s English-language films
1930s American films